Aarne Armas Saarinen (5 December 1913 – 13 April 2004) was a Finnish politician and a trade union leader, who was a member of the Parliament of Finland for the People's Democratic League. He was also the leader of the Communist-led Construction Trade Union 1954–1966, the chairman of the Communist Party of Finland 1966–1982 and the vice-chairman of the People's Democratic League 1976–1985.

Political views 
Saarinen was a stonemason who joined the local labor union branch in 1934. During World War II he fought for the Finnish troops. Saarinen was later known as one of the most prominent Communist leaders outside the Eastern Bloc. He was considered as a Eurocommunist who had sceptical views over the Soviet Union. Saarinen condemned the 1968 invasion of Czechoslovakia and during the 1970s, he resisted the efforts of the Stalinist extremists like Taisto Sinisalo to increase the Soviet influence in Finland.

Other  
Saarinen was an enthusiastic pipe smoker. In 1988 he founded the ″Society of Considerate Smokers″ together with the Finnish author and film director Jörn Donner.

References

External links

1913 births
2004 deaths
People from Ingå
People from Uusimaa Province (Grand Duchy of Finland)
Communist Party of Finland politicians
Finnish People's Democratic League politicians
Members of the Parliament of Finland (1962–66)
Members of the Parliament of Finland (1966–70)
Members of the Parliament of Finland (1972–75)
Members of the Parliament of Finland (1975–79)
Members of the Parliament of Finland (1979–83)
Finnish trade union leaders
Finnish military personnel of World War II